Kelly Rajanigandha Kapoor is a fictional character from the American television series The Office, portrayed by Mindy Kaling. She is the customer service representative at the Scranton branch of Dunder Mifflin from seasons 1 to 8. Following Kaling's departure from the show, Kelly leaves the Scranton branch at the beginning of the ninth season to get married and move to Ohio.

Storylines

Seasons 1–2
Kelly is first featured in the episode "Diversity Day", where Michael conducts a diversity training seminar. Michael creates a game where everyone in the room has to put a card with a specific race on their forehead (with the race being unknown to themselves), and then must treat everyone as if they were the race on their card. Frustrated that no one is playing properly, Michael attempts to demonstrate how to play by speaking to Kelly, who has just entered the room, in a stereotypical Indian accent. Offended, Kelly angrily slaps Michael and leaves the conference room.

In the second season, Kelly gets involved in a wildly uneven relationship with Ryan Howard, the office temp. Following their first date, Ryan expresses his regret, as their first date occurred the day before Valentine's Day. In the episode "Take Your Daughter To Work Day", Kelly shows a manipulative side upon witnessing Stanley's teenage daughter, Melissa, shadowing Ryan. Jealous, Kelly tells Stanley that Ryan had flirted with Melissa, after which Stanley berates Ryan. In the season finale "Casino Night", Ryan wearily admits to Jim that he is still dating Kelly.

Seasons 3–4
Kelly and Ryan's relationship continues throughout the third season, though at the Hindu Diwali festival, Kelly's parents criticize her choice in Ryan for not making enough money and not being committed to marriage and family; they suggest that she go for a particular, more successful Indian man. In "Business School", Michael moves Ryan's desk next to Kelly's. Kelly is excited by the move, though she and Ryan bicker and passionately make up frequently. In "Product Recall", Kelly is seen in a rare professional capacity, training Oscar, Angela, and Kevin for taking customer service phone calls after an obscene watermark is printed on Dunder Mifflin paper, prompting too many complaint calls for Kelly alone to answer.

In "The Job", Ryan abruptly ends his relationship with Kelly after receiving a promotion to the corporate headquarters. In "Dunder Mifflin Infinity", Kelly attempts to win Ryan back by telling him she is pregnant with his child. Kelly is overjoyed when Ryan agrees to have dinner with her, but the plan backfires when he learns that she is not actually pregnant; Kelly does not understand why the lie would upset him and is surprised and upset when he refuses to date her again. Ryan later asks Corporate to have Kelly's job outsourced to India.

Getting over her breakup with Ryan, Kelly begins a new relationship with warehouse foreman Darryl Philbin. However, Darryl seems less than enthusiastic about the relationship, evoking Ryan's previous attitude toward Kelly. Darryl also complains that Kelly seems to still have feelings for Ryan. In "Goodbye, Toby", Ryan gets arrested on charges of fraud, amusing Kelly.

Seasons 5–6
Kelly continues to date Darryl, though Ryan seems to have a renewed interest in her. However, she is still dating Darryl. In "Business Trip", Ryan moves back to the annex with Kelly; though Kelly strongly states she has no intention of getting back together with Ryan given the way he treated her, the two are later seen passionately kissing. Kelly breaks up with Darryl and rekindles a relationship with Ryan; however, they break up again when Ryan takes a trip to Thailand.

Towards the end of the fifth season, Kelly shows interest in her new boss, Charles Miner, and quickly befriends the new receptionist, Erin. When Ryan returns to the Scranton office, he and Kelly begin dating again.

Season 7–9
In "The Search", Ryan and Kelly announce to the staff they are getting a divorce, having married over a week earlier on the spur of the moment. They claim the break-up was mutual, but after getting little reaction to their news, Ryan declared that the split was not amicable. Following the divorce, Ryan and Kelly continue to date.

In Season 8, wanting to get Kelly away from Ryan, Pam sets her up with Cece's pediatrician, Ravi. Ryan makes several attempts to get back with Kelly, even writing a poem that Kelly refuses to read. When Ryan pressures her to choose between Ravi and him, Kelly ultimately rejects Ryan and chooses Ravi, though she expresses hope that she and Ryan can stay friends.

At the beginning of Season 9, Kelly reveals she and Ravi got engaged and moved to Oxford, Ohio. Kelly happily quit her job at Dunder-Mifflin, mistakenly believing she was moving to Miami with Ravi. Upon discovering Kelly's move, Ryan then also moves to Ohio, though he claims it's for unrelated reasons. In the series finale, Kelly and Ravi are still engaged, while Ryan is a single parent, raising a baby named Drake. At Dwight and Angela's wedding reception, Ryan induces a mild allergic reaction in his baby so that Ravi will have to examine him, using that as an excuse to get Kelly alone and tell her that he wants her back. Ecstatic, Kelly runs away with Ryan, abandoning Drake at the wedding reception; Nellie then offers to adopt Drake.

Behind the scenes
Kelly's character was conceived after the pilot episode; she first appears in the second episode "Diversity Day", in which she angrily slaps Michael Scott (played by Steve Carell) after he speaks in a stereotypical Indian accent during a conference meeting. Kelly's portrayer Mindy Kaling, who served as a writer on the show for the first eight seasons, revealed that the conception of her character was a last-minute decision by co-creator Greg Daniels, commenting "[In the script], they needed a minority to slap [Michael], and [Greg] picked me", further adding, "Greg wanted a kind of shy character that you didn't know much about, except that she was ethnic, to kind of wander in, really pissed off."

Initially introduced in the first season as a quiet and mild-mannered employee, Kelly was rewritten and expanded in the second season, with the character being portrayed as loquacious and adolescent. In a 2007 interview with The A.V. Club, Kaling spoke about the character change, stating, "[The] first season seems so different than how she is now—the way she dresses, and everything else." She credited the season 2 episode "Valentine's Day" as helping her understand Kelly's personality: "She goes on for a page and a half of dialogue about what happened to her the day before, [and] I really felt like I had an idea of what Kelly was about." The character's new personality received positive reviews from critics; Dhalia Lithwick, a senior editor at Slate magazine called the character one of the reasons to look forward to the return of the show in the fall of 2007. 

Kaling departed from the cast and crew after the eighth season to work on The Mindy Project, which Kaling created and starred as the lead character. As a result, Kelly was written out of the ninth season; she has a guest appearance in the ninth season premiere and the series finale.

References

The Office (American TV series) characters
Television characters introduced in 2005
Female characters in television
Fictional Indian-American people